Elachista praelineata is a moth of the family Elachistidae. It is found in the United States, where it has been recorded from Ohio. The habitat consists of dry hillside woods.

Description
The wingspan is 6.5 – 7.5 mm. The forewings are black, but white with a slight yellowish tinge from the base of the costa to the dorsum. There is  a white fascia before the middle, a triangular white spot at the tornus and a similar costal spot nearly opposite on the costa. There is an apical row of black scales. The hindwings are dark gray. Adults have been recorded on wing from July to August.

The larvae feed on Hystrix patula and Elymus species. They mine the leaves of their host plant. The mine starts as a narrow line, gradually widening into an elongate blotch. Mining larvae can be found in July.

References

praelineata
Moths described in 1915
Moths of North America